The Old Town Hall in Szczecin is the present day town hall in the old town district. It was built for the municipal government in the 15th century. Today it is used as a history museum.

History
At the time of its construction in the 15th century, it was known as the New Town Hall, erected at the site of the one built in the previous century. In 1968, the building was brought back to its original look and got a new shingle roof. Gothic ornaments of the interior walls and other details were restored. A sumptuously adorned elevation was to raise the prestige of the city officials. 

Part of the house is adapted to the Szczecin's History Museum (Polish: Muzeum Historii Szczecina), a part of National Museum in Szczecin. Since 1869, the building houses a popular restaurant and tavern.

References

External links 

Buildings and structures in Szczecin
Szczecin
Old Town, Szczecin